Vester Åby is a town located on the island of Funen in south Denmark, in Faaborg-Midtfyn Municipality. It is located 16 km west of Svendborg, 9 km south of Corinth, 10 km east of Faaborg and 24 km southwest of the municipality of Ringe.

Places of interest
In a former inn, Henrik Konnerup started a chocolate factory known as "Konnerup & Co" in 2003, which has 12 employees. The company went bankrupt in spring 2017, when its longtime financial partner could not continue. Local businessman Ole Billum bought the assets out of the bankruptcy estate so Konnerup could continue operations, but not as an owner.

References 

Cities and towns in the Region of Southern Denmark
Faaborg-Midtfyn Municipality